"Divas Lip Sync Live" is the second episode of the third season of the American reality competition television series RuPaul's Drag Race All Stars, which aired on VH1 on February 1, 2018. The episode has contestants impersonate famous divas and lip sync to a medley of RuPaul songs. Todrick Hall and Vanessa Williams serve as guest judges, alongside regular panelists RuPaul, Michelle Visage, and Carson Kressley.

Episode

The nine remaining queens are assigned female musicians to impersonate VH1 divas in the Divas Lip Sync Live battle, a tribute act in the form of a live medley of RuPaul songs. After rehearing with Todrick Hall, Aja performs as Amy Winehouse, BeBe Zahara Benet as Diana Ross, BenDeLaCreme as Julie Andrews, Chi Chi DeVayne as Patti LaBelle, Kennedy Davenport as Janet Jackson, Milk as Celine Dion, Shangela as Mariah Carey, Trixie Mattel as Dolly Parton, and Thorgy Thor as Stevie Nicks.

Runway
RuPaul introduces guest judges Hall and Vanessa Williams, and reveals the theme for the runway: "RuDemption Runway". The challenge has each contestant recreate a look from their original season. Upon judgement, Aja, Milk, and Trixie Mattel are deemed safe. During the critiques, BeBe Zahara Benet, BenDaLeCreme, and Shangela receive positive feedback on their performances and runway looks, with the latter two winning the challenge. Chi Chi DeVayne, Kennedy Davenport and Thorgy Thor are all criticized for their performances, while their runway looks receive praise. DeVayne is declared safe from the bottom two. Shangela and BenDeLaCreme lip sync against each other to The Pointer Sisters' "Jump (For My Love)". Shangela wins the lip sync and eliminates Thorgy Thor.

Results

Lip Sync

  The contestant was eliminated after their first time in the bottom.

Reception
In her 2018 "definitive ranking" of all the RuPaul's Drag Race musicals for In Magazine, Bianca Guzzo ranked the divas tribute number six and wrote, "This was another Rusical that had potential to be great. Our favourite Queens impersonating our favourite divas… Literally nothing could top that. Unfortunately VH1 Diva's  featured some queens having a bit of an advantage over others, which made a lot of Drag Race fans upset." In their review of the episode, Vulture.com's Bowen Yang and Matt Rogers rated "Divas Lip Sync Live" four out of five stars.

See also
 Janet Jackson as a gay icon
 List of Rusicals

References

External links
 Divas Lip Sync Live at VH1
 Drag Divas Live at IMDb

2018 American television episodes
American LGBT-related television episodes
RuPaul's Drag Race All Stars episodes